Selma Ježková is an opera by Poul Ruders based on Lars von Trier's Dancer in the Dark about a Czech immigrant coming to America. Ruders dedicated the role to Ylva Kihlberg, who sang in the premiere.

Recording
Selma Ježková (sung in English) Ylva Kihlberg (Selma), Palle Knudsen (Bill), Hanne Fischer (Kathy), Guido Paevatalu (Norman/Guard 2), Gert Henning-Jensen (District Attorney/Guard 1) & Carl Philip Levin (Gene) The Royal Danish Opera & The Royal Danish Orchestra, Michael Schønwandt  DVD

References

2010 operas
Operas
English-language operas
Operas based on films
Operas by Poul Ruders
Lars von Trier